Oettl is a surname. Notable people with the surname include:

Manfred Oettl Reyes (born 1993), Peruvian alpine skier
Ornella Oettl Reyes (born 1991), Peruvian alpine skier
Yannik Oettl (born 1996), German footballer

See also
Öttl